Howmeh Rural District is in the Central District of Sarab County, East Azerbaijan province, Iran. At the National Census of 2006, its population was 14,066 in 3,454 households. There were 14,069 inhabitants in 3,943 households at the following census of 2011. At the most recent census of 2016, the population of the rural district was 13,734 in 4,190 households. The largest of its 21 villages was Asbforushan, with 2,898 people.

References 

Sarab County

Rural Districts of East Azerbaijan Province

Populated places in East Azerbaijan Province

Populated places in Sarab County